Sardasht (also Romanized as Sar Dasht and Sār Dasht; also known as Sardasht-e Zeydūn) is a city and capital of Zeydun District, in Behbahan County, Khuzestan Province, Iran.  At the 2006 census, its population was 4,972, in 1,074 families.

References

Populated places in Behbahan County

Cities in Khuzestan Province